Jay Kirby (born William Bennett George, January 28, 1920 – July 30, 1964) was an American actor in films and television.  He was best known for playing Johnny Travers, the youthful sidekick of Hopalong Cassidy in six films in the 1940s.

In 1948, he and his wife Carmelle George were divorced and the custody of their one-year-old son, Jeffrey, was given to his wife.

Career
Kirby was born n Kansas City, Missouri. He began acting in films in 1942, when he was cast to replace Russell Hayden as the boyish partner to cowboy hero Hopalong Cassidy. He was an aviation cadet in the U.S. Army Air Forces during World War II but does not appear to have served long, as his screen appearances are continuous throughout the war and afterward for several years. In 1949 he reverted to his real name, Bill George, for his last feature film and his subsequent television roles. He died at 44 and was buried in the Los Angeles National Cemetery.

Filmography

He starred in an episode of The Cisco Kid.

References

1920 births
1964 deaths
People from Missouri
20th-century American male actors
Place of death missing